David Craighead may refer to:
 David Craighead (organist)
 David Craighead (politician)